Big D.O.L.L.A. is the third studio album by professional basketball player Damian Lillard, released under his Dame D.O.L.L.A. moniker. Unlike his previous albums, he released a regular as well as a deluxe version. The album charted on number 68 of the Top Album Charts as well as on number 12 of the indie charts.

Track listing

References

2017 albums
Hip hop albums by American artists